Evolver is the fifth studio album by American Industrial metal band Godhead, released by Reality Entertainment on July 15, 2003.

The album has sold over 100,000 copies in the United States to date.

"The Hate in Me" and "Far Too Long" were released as singles.

Track listing

Musicians
Jason C. Miller: vocals, guitar
Mike Miller: guitar, backing vocals
Method: programming, bass
Tom Z: drums

Guest musicians
Wayne Static (of Static-X): vocals, "The Giveaway"
Reeves Gabrels: guitar, "The Hate in Me," "Deconstruct," and "Rotten"

References

2003 albums
Godhead (band) albums